Farfahan (also Romanized as Farfahān) is a village in Hamzehlu Rural District, in the Central District of Khomeyn County, Markazi Province, Iran. At the 2006 census, its population was 841, in 232 families.

References 

Populated places in Khomeyn County